

Uroš is a South Slavic given or last name primarily spread amongst Serbs, and Slovenians (mostly of Serbian descent). This noun has been interpreted as "lords", because it usually appears in conjunction with velmõžie "magnates", as in the phrase  "magnates and lords". The noun was probably borrowed from the Hungarian word úr, "master" or "lord". The suffix -oš in uroš is found in a number of Slavic given or last names, particularly those of the Croats, Serbs, Czechs, and Poles.

The name may refer to:

 Several kings and tsars called Stefan Uroš
 Grand Prince Uroš I (1112-1145)
 Grand Prince Uroš II Prvoslav (1145–1162)
 Uroš Golubović, footballer
 Uroš Spajić, footballer
 Uroš Stamatović, footballer
 Uroš Slokar, basketballer
 Uroš Tripković, basketballer
 Uroš Predić, painter
 Uroš Knežević, painter
 Uroš Đurić, painter and actor
 Uroš Lajovic, conductor
 Uroš Dojčinović, guitarist
 Uroš Umek, Slovene DJ
 Uroš Drenović, military commander

See also
Urošević
Uroševac, place in Kosovo

References

Slavic masculine given names
Serbian masculine given names